Gordon Robinson "Gosh" Pettinger (November 11, 1911 – May 24, 1986) was a British-born Canadian professional ice hockey centre.

Pettinger was born in Harrogate, England and raised in Regina, Saskatchewan. He played eight seasons in the National Hockey League (NHL) for the New York Rangers, Detroit Red Wings and Boston Bruins between 1932 and 1940. Pettinger won the Stanley Cup four times with three teams: in 1933 with the Rangers, in 1936 and 1937 with the Red Wings, and in 1939 with the Bruins. He is one of 11 players to win the Cup with three or more teams. His brother Eric played in the NHL for several teams, including the Boston Bruins and the Toronto Maple Leafs.

Career statistics

Regular season and playoffs

References

External links 
 

1911 births
1986 deaths
Boston Bruins players
Bronx Tigers players
Canadian expatriate ice hockey players in the United States
Canadian ice hockey centres
Cleveland Barons (1937–1973) players
Detroit Olympics (IHL) players
Detroit Red Wings players
English ice hockey players
Hershey Bears players
Ice hockey people from Saskatchewan
London Tecumsehs players
Regina Pats players
Sportspeople from Harrogate
Sportspeople from Regina, Saskatchewan
Springfield Indians players
Stanley Cup champions
Vancouver Lions players
British emigrants to Canada